Tamia Marilyn Washington Hill (born May 9, 1975) is a Canadian singer, songwriter, and producer. Born and raised in Windsor, Ontario, Tamia performed in various singing and dancing competitions as a child. In 1994, after signing a development deal with Warner Bros. Records, she was asked by veteran producer Quincy Jones to appear on his album Q's Jook Joint (1995), earning her Grammy Award nominations for their collaboration on "You Put a Move on My Heart" and "Slow Jams". Her self-titled debut album was released in 1998 and followed by a series of successful albums with Elektra Records, including A Nu Day (2000) and  More (2004). Several songs from these albums became hit singles on the pop and R&B record charts, including "So Into You", "Stranger in My House" and "Imagination" as well as her collaborations "Into You", "Missing You" and "Spend My Life with You".

Since her departure from Elektra, Tamia has released most of her projects independently on her own label Plus One Music Group, through ventures with Def Jam, eOne Music and others. In 2015, her sixth album Love Life debuted and peaked at number two on Billboards Top R&B/Hip-Hop Albums, becoming her highest-charting album on the chart.  A NAACP Image Award recipient for her work with singer Eric Benét, Tamia is a six-time Grammy Award nominee and has been nominated for numerous other awards and accolades, including a Soul Train Music Award, a Source Award and four Juno Awards. She has been married to former basketball player Grant Hill since 1999; they have two daughters. Diagnosed with multiple sclerosis in 2003, Tamia is an advocate for the National Multiple Sclerosis Society (NMSS) on behalf of others affected by the disease.

Early life
Tamia was born in Windsor, Ontario. The only daughter of a white father and Black mother, Barbara Washington-Peden, she has three younger brothers named Tiras, Tajhee, and Trajan. Peden gave birth to Tamia when she was 17 years old and raised her children as a single mom in the projects between Glengarry Avenue and McDougall Street in downtown Windsor. Aside from the music she heard and sang at church, Tamia was exposed to diverse music from an early age by her mother. As early as age six, she was on stage singing at the local church, and by age 12, had already been involved in several musicals which helped hone her musical skills. Tamia studied piano and voice with renowned Windsor musician, Eugene Davis, who was also instrumental in encouraging her to pursue her vocal talent. It was not long before she was able to develop her skills in the Walkerville Centre for Creative Arts program for visual and performing arts students, introduced at Walkerville Collegiate Institute in Windsor.

Along with attending high school at Walkerville, she made several appearances in local theater and choral concerts before winning Canada's prestigious YTV Vocal Achievement Award in 1993. In 1994, Tamia performed at a multiple sclerosis benefit in Aspen, Colorado when she met music manager, Lionel Richie's ex-wife Brenda Richie, who was cosponsoring the event and introduced herself to Tamia after the show. A few months later, Tamia, who was being courted by Warner Bros. Records at the time, called Richie to say that she was coming to Los Angeles for a photo session, resulting in her lasting stay and a management deal with Richie. Weeks later, Richie arranged for her to perform at a star-studded party that she held for singer Luther Vandross. Her performance reportedly impressed all in attendance, including veteran producer Quincy Jones, who took notice and later offered her the chance to appear on his album Q's Jook Joint (1995).

Career

1995–1998: Collaborations and Tamia

"You Put a Move on My Heart", a Mica Paris cover, was one out of several Jones songs Tamia recorded vocals for. Selected as the first single from Q's Jook Joint, it became a moderate commercial success, reaching the top twenty of the US Billboard Hot R&B/Hip-Hop Songs, but earned acclaim from critics, resulting in a Grammy Award nomination for Best Female R&B Vocal Performance at the 39th ceremony. Tamia along with Babyface, Portrait, and Barry White received a second nomination that night for "Slow Jams", the second single from Jones' album, which fared similarly on the charts, peaking at number two on the New Zealand Singles Chart, and received a third nod in the Best Pop Collaboration with Vocals category for her performance on "Missing You", a collaboration with singers Brandy, Gladys Knight, and Chaka Khan for the soundtrack of the 1996 motion picture Set It Off. A top thirty success on the US Billboard Hot 100, it was certified gold by the Recording Industry Association of America (RIAA).

In 1997, Tamia made her film debut in the action-thriller Speed 2: Cruise Control. Playing the cruise liner's musical entertainer, she performed the Diane Warren-penned single "Make Tonight Beautiful", which was released as part of the film's soundtrack. The same year, she has also appeared in television sitcoms such as Rock Me Baby and Kenan and Kel and recorded the all-star charity single "Love Shouldn't Hurt" for the National Committee for the Prevention of Child Abuse along with All-4-One, Michael Bolton, and others. Following this, Jones enlisted the services of several producers to work on Tamia's debut self-titled album, including Jermaine Dupri, Tim & Bob, and Mario Winans, many of which would become frequent producers on subsequent projects. Upon its April 1998 release, Tamia received a mixed to positive reception by critics, who complimented Tamia's vocal performance and the progression from her earlier recordings but found the material uneven. It debuted and peaked at number sixty-seven on the US Billboard 200. Five singles were released from the album, including the top twenty entries "Imagination" and "So into You". In 1999, Tamia garnered the singer two Juno Award nominations for Best New Solo Artist and R&B/Soul Recording of the Year.

1999–2005: A Nu Day and More
In 1999, Tamia collaborated with American singer Eric Benét on his single "Spend My Life with You". The song reached the top of Billboards Hot R&B/Hip-Hop Songs chart and earned her a fourth Grammy Award nomination as well as the NAACP Image Award for Outstanding Song. Frustrated by Qwest's label politics, Tamia transitioned to Elektra Records the same year and began worked on her second album A Nu Day. Rapper-producer Missy Elliott, frequent co-producer Bink, Dallas Austin and Shep Crawford worked with Tamia on the majority project, which she declared "not as ballad-driven as" her debut album and felt it was "more aggressive in terms of the formats of the songs". Released in October 2000, A Nu Day received a mixed response from critics, who complimented her more stylish sound but found the material inconsistent. It debuted and peaked at number forty-six on the Billboard 200 and became her first top ten entry on the Top R&B/Hip-Hop Albums, peaking at number eight. A steady seller, it reached gold status in the US and produced three of Tamia's commercially most successful singles, including her only US Billboard Hot 100 top ten hit single "Stranger in My House". In 2001, A Nu Day was nominated in the R&B/Soul Recording of the Year category at the annual Juno Awards.

In 2003, Tamia appeared on the international top ten hit "Into You", a collaboration with rapper Fabolous from his second studio album Street Dreams (2003) based on her 1998 single "So into You". It reached the top five in Australia and the US and was followed by "Officially Missing You", the lead single from her third album. Initially titled Still, the project was indefinitely bumped from its original August 2003 schedule after Tamia's multiple sclerosis diagnosis and subsequent treatment. With the illness in remission, she resumed work later that year and arranged additional recording sessions to revamp parts of the album. Finally released in April 2004, More was released to generally mixed reception from music critics and debuted and peaked at number 17 on the US Billboard 200 and number four on the Top R&B/Hip-Hop Albums, with first week sales of 71,000 copies, marking the highest-selling and highest-charting opening of Tamia's catalogue yet. In support of More, Tamia was featured as a special guest on the Verizon Ladies First Tour, co-headlined by Beyoncé, Alicia Keys and Missy Elliott, which became one of the biggest concert tours of the year. In 2005, More became Tamia's third consecutive album to earn a Juno Award nomination in the R&B/Soul Recording of the Year category.

2005–2013: Between Friends and Beautiful Surprise
In order to gain more creative control over future projects, Tamia left Elektra amid its merger with Atlantic Records in 2005 and decided to go independent, founding her own record label Plus One Music Group. Unlike previous projects, she only consulted longtime contributor Shep Crawford to work with her on her fourth studio album. A rather intimate process, the pair met on a daily basis in an Orlando recording studio to write and produce new songs, with Rodney "Darkchild" Jerkins providing additional material late into the production of the album. Alluding to her working relationship with Crawford, it was eventually titled Between Friends, and first released in South Africa in May 2006 in South Africa, followed by a worldwide distribution in the fourth quarter of 2006. A moderate commercial success, it number 66 on the Billboard 200, while peaking at number 2 on Billboards Independent Albums. Its first two singles, "Can't Get Enough" and "Me", both reached the top 30 on the Hot R&B/Hip-Hop Songs chart.

In November 2009, Greatest Hits, a compilation album, was released in South Africa. The same year, Tamia announced that she was working with Crawford to form a supergroup called TDK along with singers Kelly Price and Deborah Cox. Their joint album The Queen Project failed to materialize however due timing issues and label politics. In August 2012, Tamia's fifth studio Beautiful Surprise was released on Plus One and EMI Music. The singer worked with a vast of different producers on the album, including Chuck Harmony, The Runners, and Carvin & Ivan. Beautiful Surprise earned a mixed reception from music critics and debuted at 23 on the Billboard 200 and at number six on the Top R&B/Hip-Hop Albums. Lead single "Beautiful Surprise", co-written by Claude Kelly and Salaam Remi, peaked at number 24 on the Hot R&B/Hip-Hop Songs. Both the single and its parent album received nominations in the Best R&B Song and Best R&B Album categories at the 55th Annual Grammy Awards, while garnering Tamia a Soul Train Music Award nomination at the 2012 Soul Train Music Awards. In support of Beautiful Surprise, Tamia joined R. Kelly during his The Single Ladies Tour from October until December 2012.

2014–present: Love Life and Passion Like Fire
In August 2014, Tamia signed with Def Jam Recordings, marking her return to major label ranks. Love Life, her sixth album, was completed in ten days and released on June 9, 2015, in the United States in collaboration with her own label, Plus One Music Group. A departure from her previous independent projects, she worked with a wider range of high-profile producers on its songs, including Polow da Don as well as Oak Felder and Pop Wansel from duo Pop & Oak as well as frequent collaborators Christopher "Tricky" Stewart and The-Dream. Love Life earned generally favorable reviews from critics, who summed it as "grown-up, worn-in R&B at its finest", and debuted at number 24 on the US Billboard 200, selling 16,000 copies in the week ending June 14, 2015. It also debuted on top of Billboards Top R&B Albums and at number two on the Top R&B/Hip-Hop Albums, becoming Tamia's highest-charting album ever on both charts, and spawned produced three singles, including lead single "Sandwich and a Soda" and follow-up “Stuck with Me” both of which reached the top twenty on Billboards Adult R&B Songs.

Passion Like Fire, Tamia's seventh album, was released in September 2018 through Plus One, 21 Entertainment, and eOne Music. A breakaway from her previous album, the singer worked with a smaller team of collaborators on the album, involving longtime contributors Lil Ronnie, Shep Crawford and Salaam Remi. While critical reception was generally lukewarm, the album debuted at number 145 on the US Billboard 200, becoming her lowest-charting album yet, also reaching number 17 on Top R&B Albums chart. Its release was preceded by the singles "Leave It Smokin'" and "Today I Do", the former of which became her biggest hit in years, peaking at number two on Billboards Adult R&B Songs. In support of the album, Tamia embarked on the Passion Like Fire Tour which launched on September 18, 2018, and visited most of the major US cities. In 2019, she was awarded the Soul Music Icon Award at the fourth annual Black Music Honors.

Personal life
Singer Anita Baker introduced Tamia to American basketball player Grant Hill through a blind date in Detroit, Michigan in 1996. After a courtship of about three years, the pair eventually married on July 24, 1999, in a private reception in Battle Creek, Michigan. The ceremony was officiated by Rev. John H. Grant, Hill's cousin, and attended by 250 guests. The couple initially resided in Detroit, but later relocated to Orlando, Florida when Hill left the Detroit Pistons to sign with the Orlando Magic team. Their first daughter, Myla Grace, was born on January 23, 2002. A second daughter Lael Rose Hill followed on August 9, 2007.

In 2003, amid the recording of her third album More, doctors at Duke University Hospital in Durham, North Carolina diagnosed Tamia with multiple sclerosis, a demyelinating disease in which the insulating covers of nerve cells in the brain and spinal cord are damaged, after she had been experiencing mystifying bouts of fatigue and numbness in her hands, feet and legs. While the music project was indefinitely bumped from its original August 2003 schedule, the singer went into subsequent treatment, using corticosteroids to help delay the onset of more severe symptoms. Diagnosed early, the illness has since been in remission though she has occasional but controllable symptoms.

Discography

 Tamia (1998)
 A Nu Day (2000)
 More (2004)
 Between Friends (2006)
 Beautiful Surprise (2012)
 Love Life (2015)
 Passion Like Fire (2018)

Tours

Headlining 
1998 Tour 
A Nu Day Tour 
2005 Tour 
Between Friends Tour 
Beautiful Surprise Tour 
Love Life Tour 
Passion Like Fire Tour  

Co-headlining
The Queen Project 
Soul Summer Concert Series 

Opening act
Verizon Ladies First Tour 
Single Ladies Tour

Awards and nominations
Grammy Awards

|-
| rowspan="3" | 1997
| "Missing You" (with Brandy, Chaka Khan and Gladys Knight)
| Best Pop Collaboration with Vocals
| 
|-
| "You Put a Move on My Heart" (with Quincy Jones)
| Best Female R&B Vocal Performance
| 
|-
| "Slow Jams" (with Quincy Jones, Babyface, Barry White and Portrait)
| Best R&B Performance by a Duo or Group with Vocals
| 
|-
| 2000
| "Spend My Life with You" (with Eric Benét)
| Best R&B Performance by a Duo or Group with Vocals
| 
|-
| rowspan="2" | 2013
| "Beautiful Surprise"
| Best R&B Song
| 
|-
| Beautiful Surprise
| Best R&B Album
| 
|}

NAACP Image Award

|-
| 2000
| "Spend My Life with You" (with Eric Benét)
| Outstanding Song
| 
|}

Juno Award

|-
| rowspan="2" | 1999
| 
| Breakthrough Artist of the Year
| 
|-
| Tamia
| R&B/Soul Recording of the Year
| 
|-
| 2001
| A Nu Day
| R&B/Soul Recording of the Year
| 
|-
| 2004
| Officially Missing You
| R&B/Soul Recording of the Year
| 
|-
| 2005
| More
| R&B/Soul Recording of the Year
| 
|}

Soul Train Music Awards

|-
| 2012
| 
| Best Independent/Soul Artist
| 
|}

UB Honors Awards

|-
| rowspan="2" | 2012
| rowspan="2" | Beautiful Surprise
| Best Independent Urban Album
| 
|-
| Best R&B Album Of The Year
| 
|}

RLM World Music Awards

|-
| 2013
| 
| Best Female Artist
| 
|}

Billboard R&B/Hip-Hop Awards

|-
| 2007
| 
| Top R&B/Hip-Hop Artist - Female
| 
|}

Source Awards

|-
| 2003
| "Into You" (with Fabolous)
| R&B/Rap Collaboration Of The Year
| 
|}

See also
 List of Billboard number-one dance hits
 List of artists who reached number one on the U.S. dance chart
 List of people with multiple sclerosis

References

External links
 Official
 Official site
 
 YouTube

 Interviews
 Interview with Al Sharpton on AskDoctorV.com (April 25, 2007)
 Tamia Talks New Album, Beyonce, and Country Music.

1975 births
21st-century Black Canadian women singers
20th-century Black Canadian women singers
Canadian expatriate musicians in the United States
Canadian women pop singers
Canadian gospel singers
Canadian house musicians
Canadian mezzo-sopranos
Canadian contemporary R&B singers
Canadian soul singers
Elektra Records artists
Living people
Musicians from Windsor, Ontario
People with multiple sclerosis
Qwest Records artists
Singers with a three-octave vocal range
Canadian women singer-songwriters
Ballad musicians
Canadian hip hop singers
Canadian women hip hop musicians